Ulan is a district of Abai Region in eastern Kazakhstan. The administrative center of the district is the settlement of Molodyozhnij. Population:

References

Districts of Kazakhstan
East Kazakhstan Region